Little Big Man is the debut solo studio album by American rapper Bushwick Bill of the Geto Boys. It was released on September 8, 1992 through Rap-A-Lot Records. Recording session took place at Digital Services in Houston. Production was handled by John Bido and J. Prince with co-producers Crazy C, Roland, Goldfingers and Mike Dean. It features guest appearances from Ganksta NIP and MC L.

The album peaked at number 32 on the Billboard 200 and number 15 on the Top R&B/Hip-Hop Albums chart in the United States.

Track listing

Personnel
Richard Stephen Shaw – main artist
Rowdy Williams – featured artist (track 5)
Linc "MC L" Vanderhorst – featured artist (track 11)
John Okuribido – producer, mixing, mastering
James H. Smith – producer
Michael George Dean – co-producer, engineering, mastering
Simon Cullins – co-producer, mixing
Roland Smith Jr. – co-producer
Victor "Goldfingers" Diaz – co-producer
Roger Tausz – mastering
Donavin "Kid Styles" Murray – cover illustration
J. Patrick Smith – design
Shawn Brauch – design
Okee Stewart – photography
Pen and Pixel Graphics – layout

Charts

References

External links

1992 debut albums
Bushwick Bill albums
Rap-A-Lot Records albums
Albums produced by Mike Dean (record producer)